Amaya González Solano (born 21 December 2000) is a US-born Salvadoran footballer who plays as a midfielder for college team Colorado Buffaloes and the El Salvador national team.

Early life
González was raised in Bellflower, California. She is of Salvadoran descent.

High school and college career
González has attended the Downey High School in Downey, California and the University of Colorado in Boulder, Colorado.

International career
González made her senior debut for El Salvador on 8 April 2021.

See also
List of El Salvador women's international footballers

References

2000 births
Living people
Citizens of El Salvador through descent
Salvadoran women's footballers
Women's association football midfielders
El Salvador women's international footballers
People from Bellflower, California
Sportspeople from Los Angeles County, California
Soccer players from California
American women's soccer players
Colorado Buffaloes women's soccer players
American sportspeople of Salvadoran descent